Senator Pennington may refer to:

Brooks Pennington Jr. (1925–1996), Georgia State Senate
Dennis Pennington (1776–1854), Indiana State Senate
John L. Pennington (1821–1900), Alabama State Senate